The Medical College of Georgia (often referred to as MCG) is the flagship medical school of the University System of Georgia, the state's only public medical school, and one of the top 10 largest medical schools in the United States. Established in 1828 as the Medical Academy of Georgia, MCG is the oldest and founding school of Augusta University and played a role in the establishment of the American Medical Association and the standardization of medical practices. It is the third-oldest medical school in the Southeast and the 13th oldest in the nation. With 22 departments, it offers both a Doctor of Medicine (MD) as well as MD-PhD, MD-MPH, and MD-MBA degrees. Its national ranking in research is 75, and its ranking in primary care is 91, both out of 191 ranked medical schools.

In response to the shortage of physicians, the school has undergone tremendous growth in recent years without lowering admissions requirements. Beginning in 2010, MCG expanded to include multiple regional campuses across the state. In addition to its main clinical campus in Augusta, clinical training is offered at campuses in Albany, Rome, Savannah/Brunswick, and in Athens at the University of Georgia. The Athens campus is the University of Georgia's Health Science Campus where 40 of the school's 230 students obtain full, four-year training as part of a partnership with the University of Georgia. In 2013, the MCG Foundation received $66 million as a gift from Dr. J. Harold Harrison, MD, a notable vascular surgeon and MCG alumnus. This gift allowed for the creation of a number of scholarships, multiple construction projects, and plans for further expansion in the future.

History

MCG was founded in 1828, by Milton Antony and Joseph Adams Eve, as the Medical Academy of Georgia by the Medical Society of Augusta to address a need to train new physicians. Its first seven students enrolled in a one-year course of lectures and clinical training hosted in the Old Medical College building, leading to the bachelor of medicine degree. The next year, the governor signed a legislative act altering the charter of 1828 by expanding the curriculum to two years, culminating in a doctor of medicine degree, and changing the name to the Medical Institute of Georgia. The school changed its name in 1833 to its current name, and for the next 80 years continued to operate with an emphasis on research and training physicians.

Many discoveries were made by MCG faculty, including the first hysterectomy performed in the United States and the first documented case of sickle cell disease.

For 2022, out of 191 medical schools ranked by U S News & World Report MCG was ranked #91
in Best Medical Schools: Primary Care, #75 in Best Medical Schools: Research, #90
in Most Graduates Practicing in Primary Care Fields, #68 in Most Diverse Medical Schools, and #42
in Most Graduates Practicing in Medically Underserved Areas.

Admissions
More than 3,100 students have applied for 230 first-year slots. Matriculating students entering for 2019-2020 had an average grade point average of 3.80 and MCAT score of 511, well above the national average for students accepted to US medical schools.

Campus
The main campus resides in Augusta, Georgia on the Health Sciences campus of Augusta University. All first- and second-year students attend classes at either the Augusta main campus or the University of Georgia Health Science Campus in Athens through the AU/UGA Medical Partnership. 

In a student's third and fourth years, a student may choose to study on the main Augusta campus, based at Augusta University Medical Center, or to study at a regional campus for their clinical rotations. MCG has four satellite campuses:

The Southwest campus in Albany, was the first residential campus opened in 2010. It marked the school's first efforts to increase the number of physicians produced in the state of Georgia, a problem the university had vowed to address.

The Southeast campus, in Savannah and Brunswick, opened in 2011 with seven third-year students beginning rotations at two medical centers and hosts nearly 40 students annually.

The Northwest campus is located in Rome, opened in 2013. Students work with the Harbin Clinic, Floyd Medical Center, and Redmond Regional Medical Center, with some classes and training provided on facilities provided by the centers.

The University of Georgia Health Sciences Campus in Athens where students were first hosted by the University of Georgia in 2010, aimed at growing the number of excellently prepared physicians the state produces.

Traditions

White Coat ceremony
First-year medical students are given their white coats in an annual tradition to mark their first steps as a medical professional.  The jacket is shorter than the long coats full-fledged doctors wear, to mark them as students until they earn their full degree.

Raft debate
Every year, differences in medical specialties are highlighted by one question: "A surgeon, an internist and an obstetrician are aboard a simulated sinking ship. Their only escape is a one-person raft. Who should be the sole survivor?"

Notable alumni
- Yao Kang, M.D.

- Hervey M. Cleckley, M.D.

- Leila Denmark

References

External links

Augusta University
Educational institutions established in 1828
Medical schools in Georgia (U.S. state)